Leopoldo Brizuela (June 8, 1963 – May 14, 2019) was an Argentine journalist, writer and translator. He was born in La Plata in 1963.

He won a number of literary awards, including the 2012 Premio Alfaguara for his novel Una misma noche. As a translator, he translated the works of American writers such as Henry James, Flannery O'Connor and Eudora Welty.

Personal life and death 
He was openly gay.

Leopoldo Brizuela died as a result of a long illness at the age of 55 on May 14, 2019.

Works
 1985 – Tejiendo agua, novela, Emecé, Buenos Aires
 1987 – Cantoras, reportajes a Gerónima Sequeida y Leda Valladares; Torres Agüero Editor, Buenos Aires
 1992 – Cantar la vida, conversaciones con las cantantes Mercedes Sosa, Aimé Paine, Teresa Parodi, Leda Valladares y Gerónima Sequeida; El Ateneo, Buenos Aires
 1995 – Fado, poemas, La Marca, Buenos Aires
 1999 – Inglaterra. Una fábula, novela, Alfaguara
 2001 – El placer de la cautiva, nouvelle
 2002 – Los que llegamos más lejos, relatos, Alfaguara, Buenos Aires
 2010 – Lisboa. Un melodrama, novela, Alianza
 2012 – Una misma noche, novela, Alfaguara

Prizes
 Premio Fortabat de Novela 1985 por Tejiendo agua
 Primer Premio Edelap de Cuento 1996
 Premio Clarín de Novela 1999 por Inglaterra. Una fábula
 Premio Municipal Ciudad de Buenos Aires para el bienio 1999–2000 por la novela Inglaterra. Una fábula (2001)
 Beca de la Fundación Calouste Gulbenkian de Lisboa (2001)
 Beca de la Fundación Antorchas (2002)
 Beca del Banff Center for the Arts (Canadá, 2002)
 Premio Konex 2004, Diploma al Mérito en la categoría Cuento: quinquenio 1999-20037
 Premio Alfaguara de Novela 2012 por Una misma noche

References

External links
 

20th-century Argentine male writers
21st-century Argentine male writers
Argentine LGBT writers
1963 births
2019 deaths
People from La Plata
International Writing Program alumni